Typhoon Jongdari was a strong, long-lived and erratic tropical cyclone that impacted Japan and East China in late July and early August 2018. Formed as the twelfth named storm of the 2018 typhoon season near Okinotorishima on July 24, Jongdari gradually intensified and developed into the fourth typhoon of the year on July 26. Influenced by an upper-level low and a subtropical ridge, Jongdari executed a rare counter-clockwise southeast of Japan on the next day. At that time, it also reached peak intensity. The typhoon made landfall in Kii Peninsula, over Mie Prefecture of Japan locally early on July 29.

Jongdari is one of the four Pacific tropical cyclones since 1951 that approached Honshu on a westward trajectory; the others were Typhoon Viola in 1966, Tropical Storm Ben in 1983, and Typhoon Lionrock in 2016.

Meteorological history

A tropical disturbance formed southeast of Guam on July 19 and tracked westward steadily. After issuing a Tropical Cyclone Formation Alert on July 21, the Joint Typhoon Warning Center (JTWC) upgraded the system to a tropical depression early on July 22, although the location of its low-level circulation center was not clear. The Japan Meteorological Agency (JMA), however, kept reporting it as a low-pressure area until it was upgraded to a tropical depression late on July 23. After the slow consolidation for several days, the system was upgraded to a tropical storm near Okinotorishima at around 18:00 on July 24 by agencies such as JMA and JTWC, with an international name Jongdari. A microwave imagery revealed a low-level forming eyewall next day, indicating a consolidating system. After JMA upgraded Jongdari to a severe tropical storm at noon, the system accelerated northeastward under the influence of a near-equatorial ridge to the south.

On July 26, as Jongdari started to interact with an upper-level cold-core low to the north which significantly enhanced poleward outflow, it intensified to a typhoon in the afternoon despite increasingly unfavorable vertical wind shear. As the steering influence transitioned to a subtropical ridge to the northeast, Jongdari executed a rare counter-clockwise turn to the southeast of Japan.

Jongdari began to be inundated by subsidence on July 28, as the Fujiwhara effect had made the upper-level low move to the west of the typhoon. It also initiated a weakening trend while accelerating northwestward and then westward toward the Japanese island of Honshu. At around 10:30 CST (02:30 UTC) on August 3, Tropical Storm Jongdari made landfall over Jinshan District, Shanghai. Jongdari rapidly weakened after landfall, dissipating on the next day.

Impact

Japan
24 people were injured when the typhoon hit Japan. JR-West train services were delayed or cancelled due to the storm. Although Jongdari didn't directly hit Hokuriku region, it did bring föhn wind to the area because it is located at the leeward slope of the Japanese Alps. Agricultural damage in Chiba and Aichi Prefecture were about JP¥1.59 billion (US$14.3 million). Preliminary industry loss were estimated between US$1.4–2 billion.

China
Total damage from Jongdari were about CN¥420 million (US$61.5 million).

See also

Weather of 2018
Tropical cyclones in 2018
2018 Japan heat wave
Typhoon Damrey (2012)
Typhoon Lionrock (2016)
Typhoon Noru (2017)
Hurricane Sandy – An Atlantic hurricane in 2012 which executed a similar turn into the Northeastern U.S.

References

External links

JMA General Information of Typhoon Jongdari (1812) from Digital Typhoon

15W.JONGDARI from the U.S. Naval Research Laboratory

2018 Pacific typhoon season
July 2018 events in Asia
August 2018 events in Asia
Typhoons in Japan
Typhoons in China
Jongdari